Al Alam Al Youm (Arabic: العالم اليوم; The World Today) is an Arabic business newspaper published in Cairo, Egypt. It is the first private specialized independent paper of the country.

History and profile
Al Alam Al Youm, based in Cairo, was launched in 1991 as the first business newspaper in Egypt. In addition, it is the first privately owned independent newspaper of the country. Yasser Thabet and Emad Adeeb are the founders of the paper.

The owner of the paper is Good New 4Me Holding Company which also owns Nahdet Misr, another newspaper. As of 2012 Emad Adeeb was the chairman and Lamis Elhadidy was the chief executive officer of the paper. Although the paper billed itself an independent publications both Adeeb and Elhadidy were among the supporters of the former President Hosni Mubarak in the mid 2000s.

It is published six times per week and focuses on business news in relation to Egypt, the Middle East and the other parts of the world. The paper also offers financial analyses. Its target audiences include opinion leaders, businesspeople  and decision-makers at multinational and private companies. The paper has offices in Paris, London, Geneva, Bonn, Saudi Arabia, Kuwait, Qatar, Bahrain, Morocco, and Beirut. It publishes an Egyptian edition and a Gulf region edition.

In 2003, the approximate number of its readers was 650,000, and its circulation was 15,000 copies. In 2005 the paper sold 35,000 copies.

References

External links

1991 establishments in Egypt
Arabic-language newspapers
Business in Egypt
Business newspapers
Daily newspapers published in Egypt
Mass media in Giza
Publications established in 1991